Mary Magdalene de' Pazzi, OCarm (April 2, 1566 – May 25, 1607), was an Italian Carmelite nun and mystic. She has been declared a saint by the Catholic Church.

Life 
De' Pazzi was born at Florence, Italy, on April 2, 1566, to Camillo di Geri de' Pazzi, a member of one of the wealthiest and most distinguished noble families of Renaissance Florence, and Maria Buondelmonti. She was christened Caterina, but in the family was called Lucrezia, out of respect for her paternal grandmother, Lucrezia Mannucci.

At the age of nine de' Pazzi was taught how to meditate by the family chaplain, using a then-recently published work explaining how one should meditate on the Passion of Christ. Years later, this book was one of the items she brought with her to the monastery. Around the age of nine is also when de' Pazzi began practicing mortification of the flesh through self-flagellation, wearing a barbed metal cilice, and wearing a home-made crown of thorns. She received her First Communion at the then-early age of 10 and made a vow of virginity the same year. She experienced her first ecstasy when she was only twelve, in her mother's presence. From then on, she continued to exhibit what she considered to be many varied mystical experiences.

In 1580, at age fourteen, de' Pazzi was sent by her father to be educated at a monastery of nuns of the Order of Malta, but she was soon recalled to wed a young nobleman. Caterina advised her father of her vow, and he eventually relented and allowed her to enter monastic life. She chose the Carmelite monastery of Santa Maria degli Angeli in Florence because the rule there allowed her to receive Holy Communion daily. On January 30, 1583, she was accepted as a novice by that community, and took the religious name of Sister Mary Magdalene.

Mystic
De' Pazzi had been a novice for a year when she became critically ill. Upon receiving the religious habit, one of the sisters asked her how she could bear so much pain without a murmur. Mary pointed to the crucifix and said:

Death seemed near, so her superiors let her make her profession of religious vows in a private ceremony, while lying on a cot in the chapel. Immediately after, she fell into an ecstasy that lasted about two hours. This was repeated on the following 40 mornings, each time after Communion.

As a safeguard against deception and to preserve the revelations, the de' Pazzi confessor asked her to dictate her experiences to her fellow nuns. Over the next six years, five large volumes were filled. The first three record ecstasies from May 1584 through Pentecost week of the following year. That particular week was a preparation for a severe five-year trial that she relates. The fourth book records that trial, and the fifth is a collection of letters concerning reform and renewal. Another book, Admonitions, is a collection of her sayings arising from her experiences in the formation of women in religious orders.

It was believed that de' Pazzi could read the thoughts of others and predict future events. For instance, during one ecstatic event she predicted the future elevation to the papacy of Cardinal Alessandro de' Medici (as Pope Leo XI). During her lifetime, she allegedly appeared to several persons in distant places and cured a number of sick people.

De' Pazzi died on May 25, 1607, at the age of 41. She was buried in the choir of the monastery chapel. At her canonization in 1668 her body was declared miraculously incorrupt. Her relic corpse is located in the Monastery of Maria Maddalena de' Pazzi in Careggi.

Veneration

Two years after de' Pazzi died, the Jesuit Vincenzo Puccini, her confessor, published the life of this Carmelite nun as an edifying example. The 1639 edition was augmented with material relating to the mystic's canonization, and was purposefully dedicated to two nieces of Pope Urban VIII. 

Numerous miracles allegedly followed de' Pazzi's death, and the process for her beatification was begun in the year 1610 under Pope Paul V, and completed under Pope Urban VIII in the year 1626. She was not, however, canonized until 62 years after her death, when Pope Clement IX raised her to the altars on April 28, 1669. The church of the Monastery of Pažaislis, commissioned in 1662 in Lithuania, was one of the first to be consecrated in her honor. Puccini's successful biography first was translated into French in honor of her canonization.

Nowadays, de' Pazzi herself is little known outside Italy, but her cult is very strong, especially in Florence. Paulist Press issued a selection of her writings in English translation in their series of Classics of Western Spirituality. Her importance in the Mission to the East especially in connection with India is recently explored.

The quote Never utter in your neighbors' absence what you would not say in their presence. is attributed to her on the web.

Feast day

In 1670, the year after de' Pazzi's canonization, the feast day of the saint was inserted in the General Roman Calendar for celebration on May 25, the day of her death. In 1728, the date of May 25 was assigned instead to Pope Gregory VII, and her feast day was moved to May 29, where it remained until 1969, when it was restored to its original place in the calendar, as the true anniversary of her death.

Mortification 
Pazzi was known to have worn little clothing and to have whipped herself with a crown of thorns. According to researcher Ian Wilson, sometimes she would wear only a single garment but she would tear this off "in order to roll herself on thorns, or give herself another savage beating". Wilson described Pazzi as a "florid, sadomasochistic neurotic".

Asti Hustvedt has written that "Pazzi wore a crown of thorns and a corset onto which she had attached piercing nails. She also walked barefoot through the snow, dripped hot wax onto her body, and licked the wounds of the diseased, including those afflicted with leprosy."

The anthropologist Eric Dingwall wrote a chapter on Pazzi's alleged masochism and flagellant behaviors in Very Peculiar People (1962).

Psychiatrist Armando Favazza in Bodies under Siege (3rd edition, 2011) wrote:

Psychiatrist Kathryn J. Zerbe has written that Pazzi was a sufferer of anorexia mirabilis. She also displayed behavioral symptoms of bulimia.

See also 

 Carmelite Rule of St. Albert
 Book of the First Monks

References

Further reading
 Copeland, Clare. Maria Maddalena de’ Pazzi : The Making of a Counter-Reformation Saint. Oxford ; New York, NY: Oxford University Press, 2016.
 Mary Magdalen de' Pazzi, The Complete Works of Saint Mary Magdalen de' Pazzi Carmelite and Mystic (1566–1607), 5 vols, translated by Gabriel Pausback, O.Carm., Fatima 1969–1973.
 The Life of St. Mary Magdalen De-Pazzi, Florentine Noble, Sacred Carmelite Virgin Compiled by the Rev Placido Fabrini, Philadelphia, 1900, Translated from the Florentine Edition of 1852 and Published by the Rev Antonio Isoleri, Miss. Ap. Rector of the new St Mary Magdalen De-Pazzi's Italian Church, Philadelphia, Pa, USA

External links 
    Index of Websites on Mary Magdalene de' Pazzi
 
 Super Saints: St. Mary Magdalen de' Pazzi on Youtube

1566 births
1607 deaths
Nobility from Florence
Mary Magdalene
Carmelite nuns
16th-century Italian Roman Catholic religious sisters and nuns
Carmelite mystics
Venerated Carmelites
16th-century Christian saints
16th-century Christian mystics
17th-century Christian saints
17th-century Christian mystics
Carmelite saints
Incorrupt saints
Italian Roman Catholic saints
Christian female saints of the Early Modern era
Women mystics
Beatifications by Pope Urban VIII
Religious leaders from Florence
Canonizations by Pope Clement IX